The 2001 season was the Jacksonville Jaguars' 7th in the National Football League and their seventh under head coach Tom Coughlin.

This was the debut year where the Jaguars wore black shoes to their uniforms. The team from then as of 2019 still wears the black shoes with the updated uniforms introduced in 2018.

Offseason

Draft

Personnel

Staff

Roster

Regular season

Schedule 

Note: Intra-division opponents are in bold text.

Season summary

Week 17

Standings

References 

 Jaguars on Pro Football Reference
 Jaguars schedule on jt-sw.com

Jacksonville Jaguars
Jacksonville Jaguars seasons
Jackson